Eublemma vestalis is a species of moth of the family Erebidae first described by Arthur Gardiner Butler in 1886. It is found in Queensland in Australia.

Adults have pale yellow wings with a dark brown margin and an extra brown mark near the apex of the forewing.

References

Boletobiinae
Moths described in 1886